Maamiyar Veedu is a 1993 Indian Tamil-language film written and directed by S. Ganesaraj. The film stars Saravanan, Selva, Sithara and Nandhini. It was released on 14 January 1993.

Plot 
Aravind and Parthasarathy alias Pacha are small-time crooks who don't have any relatives. They meet each other in jail, and the two soon become good friends. After their release from jail, Aravind doesn't know where to go, so Parthasarathy accommodates him at his home.

Both continue to steal. One day, they steal money from an old village man Korai Kaluthu Kuppusamy. The next day, the old man dies from a heart attack. Feeling guilty, Aravind tries to help the late Kuppusamy's family. Aravind decides to become a good man, but Parthasarathy does not want to change and strongly believe that the society will not accept it. Aravind gets married with Anandavalli, who was brought up in a prostitute house environment, but not a prostitute. Meanwhile, Parthasarathy falls in love with Kuppusamy's granddaughter Daisy. Parthasarathy then clashes with the dreaded don Kondaiah.

After he witnesses Daisy's father immolating himself for not paying back debts to Kondaiah. Pacha avenges his death by brutally slashing Kondaiah's leg. Inspector Vijay, corrupt, cat-eyed inspector who earlier arrested Aravind and Pacha decides to investigate the murder. He arrests Aravind and shoots him on the pretext of getting him released.

The cat-eyed inspector Vijay also arrests Anandavalli at a nearby departmental shop when she goes to purchase baby food. The inspector was in no mood to listen to her appeal that, the baby is alone at home and takes her to police station for further enquiry.

On next day morning, she is released from police station based on the recommendation of prostitution house head-lady, who is well known to Inspector Vijay.

When she heads to home, she is shocked to see that the baby is dead due to a day long hunger.

As Anandavalli is deeply saddened by Aravind's death while also losing her baby in the process. She murders Vijay and gets arrested with Pacha lamenting that police never lets criminals to lead a peaceful life.

Cast 

Saravanan as Aravind
Selva as Parthasarathy
Sithara as Anandavalli
Nandhini as Daisy
Thalaivasal Vijay as Inspector Vijay
Chitti as Kondaiah
Kula Deivam V. R. Rajagopal as Korai Kaluthu Kuppusamy
Veeraraghavan as Inspector General of Police
Vennira Aadai Moorthy
Charle
Ponnambalam
Kumarimuthu as Tiger Babu
S. N. Parvathy
C. R. Saraswathi
Pasi Sathya
Bhanu Prakash
Ramanathan
Vaithy
Manager Cheena
Krishnamoothy
Prathan
Kokila
Nisha
Vasuki
Vasantha
Manjuvaani

Soundtrack 
The soundtrack was composed by Ilaiyaraaja, with lyrics by Vaali.

Reception 
C. R. K. of Kalki wrote that a clear foundation, a series of events and dialogues that perfectly sits in its place.

Notes

References

External links 
 

1993 films
1990s Tamil-language films
Films scored by Ilaiyaraaja